Dinesh Singh (19 July 1925 – 30 November 1995) was an Indian politician. His family is from Kalakankar. He served as a Member of Parliament on several occasions, and twice served as the Minister of External Affairs of India.

Early life and education
Dinesh Singh was born on 19 July 1925, to Raja Awadhesh Singh, the taluqdar, or landed nobleman, of Kalakankar in Uttar Pradesh. He was educated at The Doon School, Dehradun and at Lucknow University.

Political career
In 1962-66 he was Deputy Minister in the Ministry of External Affairs 1962–66,  Minister of State 1966–67, and Minister of Commerce 1967-69 and 1988–89, Minister of Industrial Development and Internal Trade 1970–71.  He was Minister of External Affairs 1969-70 and 1993–1995.

He was elected from Pratapgarh for seven terms from the Second Lok Sabha (1957–62), to the Fifth Lok Sabha (1971–77), and then again for the Eighth and Ninth Lok Sabha 1984–1991, serving in the Rajya Sabha in the interregnum.

Personal life
He married Neelima Kumari of the Tehri-Garhwal ruling family, in 1944, and had six daughters. His sixth daughter is Ratna Singh, who was also a member of Lok Sabha from the same Pratapgarh constituency.

He died on 30 November 1995 in New Delhi, due to various diseases. At the time of his death, he was a minister without portfolio in the Cabinet headed by P. V. Narasimha Rao.

See also
 Brajesh Singh, uncle of Dinesh Singh.

References

External links
Kalakankar royal family tree 

1925 births
1995 deaths
Ministers for External Affairs of India
Indian National Congress politicians
India MPs 1957–1962
India MPs 1962–1967
India MPs 1967–1970
India MPs 1971–1977
Rajya Sabha members from Uttar Pradesh
People from Pratapgarh, Uttar Pradesh
University of Lucknow alumni
Lok Sabha members from Uttar Pradesh
India MPs 1984–1989
India MPs 1989–1991
People from Banda district, India
The Doon School alumni
Commerce and Industry Ministers of India
Janata Party politicians